Lon Walter Jourdet (September 12, 1888 – August 31, 1959) was the head men's basketball coach for the University of Pennsylvania from 1914–1920 and then again from 1930–1943. He is credited with inventing an early version of the zone defense used in modern basketball. During his coaching career, he amassed an overall record of 226 wins and 143 losses. His 1919–20 team finished the season with a 21–1 record and was retroactively named the national champion by the Helms Athletic Foundation and the Premo-Porretta Power Poll. Jourdet's win total was the highest in Penn men's basketball history until Fran Dunphy surpassed him in 2001–02, and his seven conference titles are second to Dunphy's 10.

As a student athlete at the University of Pennsylvania, Jourdet played on the football and basketball teams. He lettered in basketball from 1910–11 to 1912–13, while in football he lettered from 1910 to 1912. As a senior during the 1912 season, Jourdet was named a football All-American.

The reason for his extended absence as Penn basketball's head coach between 1920 and 1930 was summed up by The Pennsylvania Gazette in its December 3, 1920 issue, which said Jourdet "on account of a business transfer to another part of the country, has been obliged to give up coaching." He transferred to Kentucky and became engrained in both high school and college basketball there. Jourdet even officiated some of the University of Kentucky men's basketball games.

Upon returning to the Philadelphia area, Jourdet coached the Quakers for 13 more seasons and won three more Eastern Intercollegiate Basketball League championships (the conference precursor to the modern Ivy League). From 1949 to 1959, Jourdet worked in a state liquor store in Lancaster, Pennsylvania. In mid-August 1959, he was admitted to the Samuel G. Dixon Tuberculosis Hospital. On August 31, he jumped out of the third-story window of the hospital, suffering a broken neck. Jourdet was 70 years old at the time of his suicide.

Head coaching record

References

1888 births
1959 suicides
American football ends
Basketball coaches from Pennsylvania
Basketball players from Pennsylvania
College men's basketball head coaches in the United States
College men's basketball referees in the United States
Penn Quakers football players
Penn Quakers men's basketball coaches
Penn Quakers men's basketball players
People from Crawford County, Pennsylvania
Players of American football from Pennsylvania
Sportspeople from Lancaster, Pennsylvania
Suicides by jumping in the United States
American men's basketball players
Suicides in Pennsylvania